Oliver Cromwell's Letters and Speeches: with Elucidations is a book by the Scottish essayist, historian and philosopher Thomas Carlyle. It "remains one of the most important works of British history published in the nineteenth and twentieth centuries."

Composition 

Carlyle was attracted to Cromwell due to their shared Protestant upbringing and biblical rhetorical style, as well as Cromwell's "sense of the divine vitality of the universe, his hostility to democracy, and his belief that heroes can be the agents of God's will."

Carlyle began writing with Cromwell in mind in 1840 but he did not settle on Cromwell's letters and speeches as the focus of a book until late 1843. His first definitive statement that he would collect the letters and speeches comes in a letter to Edward FitzGerald dated 9 January 1844 wherein he proposed "the gathering of all Oliver's Letters and Speeches, and stringing them together according to the order of time."

Carlyle was contemplating a biography of Cromwell when he concluded his initial work in October 1844 writing to FitzGerald on 8 February 1845 that "The Life must follow when it can." During the spring and summer of 1845 Carlyle added many annotations full of commentary and narrative to the gathering, which in effect became the biography that he wanted to write.

The publication of the first edition helped turn up a large number of additional letters which Carlyle incorporated into a second edition published in June 1846. More letters accompanied the third edition of November 1849.

Squire papers 
William Squire, a "practiced hoaxer", forwarded thirty five letters to Carlyle, alleged to have been written by Cromwell to Samuel Squire, a cornet and auditor in Cromwell's army who in fact did not exist. William Squire had written the letters himself. Believing them to be genuine, Carlyle published them in the December 1847 issue of Fraser's Magazine. Their authenticity was quickly questioned by critics, such as John Bruce of the Camden Society, Ralph Waldo Emerson, Thomas Babington Macaulay and Bernard Bolingbroke Woodward. Carlyle included the letters in the third edition on the advice of John Forster and Edward FitzGerald, despite the addition of a headnote to the appendix stating that they were "semi-romantic or Doubtful Documents of Oliver's History". In 1885, Samuel Rawson Gardiner discovered evidence which contradicted assertions contained in the Squire papers, though William Aldis Wright still defended them as authentic. Finally, Walter Rye unearthed Squire's history of hoaxing, confirming that the letters were forgeries.

Reception and influence 
James Anthony Froude called it the nineteenth century's "most important contribution to English history," explaining that "with the clear sight of Oliver himself, we have a new conception of the Civil War and of its consequences." George Peabody Gooch wrote that "it was the proudest achievement of [Carlyle's] life to restore to England one of her greatest sons . . . the 'Cromwelliad' remains a marvellous production." Wilbur Cortez Abbott called it "the greatest literary monument to the Protector's memory."

The book influenced the Transcendentalists and permeated popular American culture. Joel T. Headley's biography of Cromwell "recycled Carlyle for the masses," thereby influencing John Brown, who modelled himself after Cromwell as described by Headley.

Bibliography 

 Amigoni, David. Victorian Biography: Intellectuals and the Ordering of Discourse. Hemel Hempstead: Harvester Wheatsheaf, 1993.
 Blaine, Marlin E. "Carlyle's Cromwell and the Virtue of the Inarticulate." Carlyle Annual 13 (1992–1993): 77–88.
 
 Morrow, John. "Heroes and Constitutionalists: The Ideological Significance of Thomas Carlyle's Treatment of the English Revolution." History of Political Thought 14 (1993): 205–23.
 Trela, D. J. A History of Carlyle's Oliver Cromwell's Letters and Speeches. Lewiston, N.Y.: Edwin Mellen Press, 1992.

References

External links 

 Oliver Cromwell's Letters and Speeches at the Internet Archive
 Review of Carlyle's "Oliver Cromwell's Letters and Speeches" by John Mitchel

Works by Thomas Carlyle